Jürg Grünenfelder (born 8 January 1974 in Netstal) is a former Swiss alpine skier who competed in the 1998 Winter Olympics.

References

External links
 sports-reference.com
 

1974 births
Living people
Swiss male alpine skiers
Olympic alpine skiers of Switzerland
Alpine skiers at the 1998 Winter Olympics
People from Glarus
20th-century Swiss people